= Robert Arondeaux =

17th century sculptor

Robert Arondeaux (abbreviated as R. A. on some of his works) was a sculptor and medallist who was employed by both William III and Louis XIV. Both his date of birth and date of death are unknown. He was probably Flemish.

== Works ==
Arondeaux was very prolific in his work, designing over twenty medals during the period 1678 to 1702.
